Vladimir Sergeyevich Ivashov (28 August 1939 — 23 March 1995) was a Soviet and Russian actor.

Biography 
He had a film career that spanned over 30 years. He is best known for his role as Pvt. Alyosha Skvortsov in Ballad of a Soldier which he starred in with Zhanna Prokhorenko in 1959. The film was awarded the Moscow International Film Festival award in 1960. It also won the Lenin Award. The film was kept in the film hall of The Kremlin to be shown to foreign guests.

Ivashov died in Moscow, Russia on 23 March 1995 of acute gastric ulcer at the age of 55. Asteroid 12978 Ivashov, discovered by Lyudmila Zhuravleva in 1978, was named in his memory.

Personal life 
Wife — actress Svetlana Svetlichnaya. Two sons — Oleg and Alexey.

Selected filmography 
 Ballad of a Soldier (1959) as Alyosha Skvortsov
 Seven Nannies (1962) as Viktor
 Hero of Our Time (1965) as Grigory Pechorin
 The Hockey Players (1965) as Morozov
 Torrents of Steel (1967) as Alexey Prikhodko
 The Nile and the Life (1968) as Nikolai
 The New Adventures of the Elusive Avengers (1968) as lieutenant Perov,  Kudasov's adjutant
 The Crown of the Russian Empire, or Once Again the Elusive Avengers (1971) as former lieutenant Perov
Those People of the Nile (1972) as Nikolai
 Hopelessly Lost (1973) as Colonel Sherborne
 Remember Your Name  (1974) as major
 Diamonds for the Dictatorship of the Proletariat (1975) as Isayev
 Jarosław Dąbrowski (1976) as Andrey Afanasevich Potebnya
 Father Sergius (1978) as episode
 Inquest of Pilot Pirx (1979) as Harry Brown
 Star Inspector (1980) as Sergey Lazarev
 Day of Wrath (1985) as Cast

References

External links

1939 births
1995 deaths
Male actors from Moscow
Soviet male film actors
20th-century Russian male actors
Russian male film actors
Soviet male voice actors
Honored Artists of the RSFSR
People's Artists of the RSFSR
Gerasimov Institute of Cinematography alumni
Burials at Vagankovo Cemetery